Wiram Knowlton (January 24, 1816June 27, 1863) was an American politician and jurist from Wisconsin. He was a Wisconsin Circuit Court Judge and ex officio Justice of the pre-1853 Wisconsin Supreme Court (the Wisconsin Supreme Court before 1853 was composed of the state's elected circuit court judges).

Biography

Born in Canandaigua, New York, Knowlton moved to Janesville, Wisconsin Territory, in 1837 and began to study law.  He was admitted to the bar in 1840 and started a law practice in Prairie du Chien, where he was also elected to the Wisconsin Territorial Council (upper house of the Territorial Legislature) from 1845 to 1847.

During the Mexican–American War, he raised a company of men using the W.H.C. Folsom House.  He was elected captain of the company and they were stationed at Fort Winnebago for frontier duty, freeing up the regular garrison to be redeployed to the south. In July 1850, he was elected Wisconsin Circuit Court judge for the newly created 6th circuit and sworn into office in August. Because of this office, he also served as a justice of the Wisconsin Supreme Court, which at the time was composed of Wisconsin's circuit court judges. This changed in 1853, when a separate supreme court was created by an act of the Wisconsin Legislature. Knowlton died in Menekaunee, Wisconsin.

Knowlton's brother, James H. Knowlton, was a member of the Wisconsin State Assembly.

References

Politicians from Canandaigua, New York
People from Prairie du Chien, Wisconsin
American military personnel of the Mexican–American War
Members of the Wisconsin Territorial Legislature
19th-century American politicians
Wisconsin state court judges
Justices of the Wisconsin Supreme Court
1816 births
1863 deaths
19th-century American judges